Mimoň is a town in Česká Lípa District in the Liberec Region of the Czech Republic. It has about 6,400 inhabitants.

Administrative parts
Mimoň is made up of town parts of Mimoň I–VI and villages of Srní Potok and Vranov.

Geography

It lies in the Ralsko Uplands. The town is situated at the confluence of the Ploučnice River and Panenský Stream. There is a system of four breeding ponds in the area, Mimoň Ponds, fed by the Ploučnice.

History
The oldest archaeological finds from the area around Mimoň are from the Neolithic and the Bronze Age. The first Slavic settlements appeared in the 5th century, later German colonists came.

14–17th centuries
The first written mention of Mimoň is from 1352, when it was a parish village. Mimoň was then mentioned in 1371 as a customs post on an old trading route from Zittau to Prague. At the time, the village was under the control of the Lords of Wartenberg.

The economic development of Mimoň was affected by the Hussite Wars. In 1500, Mimoň was acquired by the Bieberstein family. In 1505, Mimoň was first referred to as a town. The Biebersteins had built here a manor house in 1570. During the Thirty Years' War, Mimoň was damaged by fire. In 1651, Mimoň was bought by the Putz of Adlersthurm family. During their rule, the town prospered. The family had most of the important buildings built: the church, the Chapel of the Holy Sepulchre, the town hall, a hospital, a brewery, and had the manor house rebuilt into a castle.

18th and 19th century
In 1718, the town was inherited by the Hartig family, who owned it until 1945. In 1806, the town was almost completely destroyed by a fire. In 1836, a textile factory was established by master cloth maker Anton Schicketanz (1803–1866).

After the Revolutionary events in 1848, Mimoň became part of the judicial district of Niemes for the Habsburg Crownland of Bohemia (and later for Austria-Hungary). This district included 26 small villages in a large wooded area east of Mimoň such as Kuřívody, Hvězdov, Hradčany, Vranov, Svébořice, Černá Novina, Strážov, Stráž pod Ralskem and Olšina.

In 1883, the first railway station of the Imperial Royal Austrian State Railways was completed in Mimoň. At the end of the 19th century, Mimoň had a furniture factory, cloth and cotton weaving companies, a tannery and a beer brewery. Agriculture and forestry was also practiced.

20th–21st centuries
After the World War I and the Dissolution of Austria-Hungary, Mimoň became part of newly created Czechoslovakia in late October 1918. German citizens in Mimoň protested until Czech soldiers entered the town to keep order. In 1930 the population was of Mimoň was over 6,000 of which over 5,000 people were German-speaking.

With the rise of Nazism in Germany, so did German Nationalism through much of German-Bohemia. After the Munich Agreement in 1938, Mimoň became part of the Deutsch Gabel County, Aussig district, in Reichsgau Sudetenland of Nazi Germany. Some citizens of Mimoň became part of the paramilitary group Sudetendeutsches Freikorps who officially welcomed German Wehrmacht troops into the town on 10 October 1938. During the World War II, there was a military training camp of the Hitler Youth in Mimoň.

From 6 to 11 May 1945, during the Prague Offensive, Czechoslovakia was liberated by the Soviet Red Army and Czech freedom fighters. The Red Army bombed Mimoň by air and arrived in Mimoň on 10 May 1945. By the summer of 1945, Soviet-occupied Czechoslovakia began a program to prosecute surviving Nazis and evict ethnic Germans out of the country. Most of the German population of Mimoň was emptied and re-populated by Czechs.

During the Cold War Era, Mimoň became a manufacturing hub for furniture, textiles as well as a Machine Tractor Station (state enterprise for maintaining agricultural machinery).

In 2010 Mimoň was hit by a severe flood. Afterwards, the town made extensive repairs to its infrastructure.

Demographics

Transport
Mimoň lies on the Liberec–Ústí nad Labem railway.

Sights

A church existed here already in the 12th century. The parish Church of Saints Peter and Paul was built on the site of the old church in the baroque style in 1661–1663. The tower was built in 1674 and the rectory in 1678.

The town centre is formed by the 1. máje Square. A column with statue of the Virgin Mary was set up on the town square in 1677.

The castle in Mimoň was used by the Czechoslovak army and fell into disrepair. By the 1980s, the castle was in ruins and was demolished in 1985. The only reminder of the castle still in existence is the Mimoň Castle Park and the castle pond.

Notable people
Louis Nerz (1867–1938), screenwriter and actor
Stefanie Rabatsch (1887–1975), Hitler's love interest
Rudolf Watzke (1892–1972), bass singer
Jaroslav Bureš (born 1954), lawyer and politician

Twin towns – sister cities

Mimoň is twinned with:
 Nová Baňa, Slovakia
 Oelsnitz, Germany
 Złotoryja, Poland

References

External links

Populated places in Česká Lípa District
Cities and towns in the Czech Republic